Karl Björkänge  (born Karl Andersson, 31 August 1895, Tumbo – 31 January 1966) was a Swedish politician. He was a member of the Centre Party. He was elected to the Swedish parliament (lower house) in 1949.

Members of the Riksdag from the Centre Party (Sweden)
1895 births
1966 deaths
People from Södermanland
Members of the Andra kammaren
Place of death missing
20th-century Swedish politicians